Roger Miller may refer to:

 Roger Miller (1936–1992), American singer/songwriter
 Dean Miller (1965–), born Roger Miller, Jr., an American country music artist and son of Roger Miller above 
 Roger Miller (rock musician), guitarist of Mission of Burma
 Roger Miller (cricketer, born 1857), English cricketer
 Roger Miller (cricketer, born 1938), English cricketer
 Roger Miller (baseball) (1954–1993), MLB baseball player
 Roger Miller (cricketer, born 1972), English cricketer who represented the Hampshire Cricket Board

See also  
 Roger Milla (born 1952), former Cameroonian footballer
 Roger Millar (engineer) Washington State Secretary of Transportation